Brock Air Services was a Canadian charter and Medivac airline based in Kingston, Ontario, Canada.

History 
The airline was founded in 1978.

Operations 
Brock Air Services operated on-demand air charter services at Kingston Airport and Brockville Municipal Airport. The airline provided air ambulance service under contract with Ornge (Ontario Air Ambulance).
The airline also manages the Brockville airport.

Fleet
As of January 2006 the company operated:
1 Cessna 421
1 Cessna 172

See also 
 List of defunct airlines of Canada

References

External links
Brock Air Services official site

Defunct airlines of Canada
Companies based in Kingston, Ontario
Transport in Kingston, Ontario
Regional airlines of Ontario
Air ambulance services in Canada